Nikhil Bohra (born 25 January 2005) is an American racing driver with Indian roots. He will be competing in the 2023 Formula Regional European Championship
for Trident.

Career

Lower formulae

2021 
Bohra made his single-seater debut at the end of 2021, where he competed in the ADAC F4 season finale at the Nürburgring with R-ace GP.

2022 
Continuing on in 2022, the American would plant himself into the Italian F4 Championship on a full-time basis, driving for US Racing alongside Alex Dunne, Kacper Sztuka, Marcus Amand and Pedro Perino. His season began slowly, as the opening two rounds yielded no points. However, the third event at Spa-Francorchamps would prove to be successful, with Bohra taking his first points finishes, which included a sixth place in Race 2. More points followed at Vallelunga, before Bohra scored his season-best result of fourth at the Red Bull Ring, a race in which he would also score his maiden rookie podium. He finished off his season with a pair of seventh places in Mugello, which elevated him to 13th in the main standings.

That year Bohra also competed in the first two rounds of the ADAC F4 Championship, where he scored ten points.

2023 
Bohra is set to make the jump up to the 2023 Formula Regional European Championship with Trident.

Racing record

Racing career summary 

* Season still in progress.

Complete Italian F4 Championship results 
(key) (Races in bold indicate pole position) (Races in italics indicate fastest lap)

Complete Formula Regional Middle East Championship results
(key) (Races in bold indicate pole position) (Races in italics indicate fastest lap)

* Season still in progress.

Complete Formula Regional European Championship results 
(key) (Races in bold indicate pole position) (Races in italics indicate fastest lap)

References

External links 

 

Living people
2005 births
American racing drivers
Indian racing drivers
Racing drivers from New York City
American sportspeople of Indian descent
ADAC Formula 4 drivers
Italian F4 Championship drivers
UAE F4 Championship drivers
Formula Regional European Championship drivers
R-ace GP drivers
US Racing drivers
Trident Racing drivers
Formula Regional Middle East Championship drivers